Events from the year 1598 in art.

Events
Marin le Bourgeoys is appointed Valet de Chambre to King Henry IV of France.  At court he produces artwork, firearms, air guns, crossbows, and movable globes.
The first recorded use of the term "landscape" in English, to refer to a genre of painting, borrowed from the Dutch term "landschap".

Works
Federico Barocci (Galleria Borghese, Rome)
Aeneas' Flight from Troy
St. Jerome
Caravaggio
Saint Catherine
Sacrifice of Isaac
Martha and Mary Magdalene
Portrait of Maffeo Barberini

Births
May 23 - Claude Mellan, French engraver and painter (died 1688)
July 31 – Alessandro Algardi, Italian sculptor (died 1654)
November 7 – Francisco de Zurbarán, Spanish Baroque painter (died 1664)
December 7 – Gian Lorenzo Bernini, Italian Baroque sculptor and architect of 17th century Rome (died 1680)
date unknown
Bartholomeus Breenbergh, Dutch painter (died 1657)
Domingos da Cunha, Portuguese painter (died 1644)
Giovanni Andrea de Ferrari, Italian painter of the Baroque period active in Genoa (died 1669)
Willem de Passe, Dutch engraver and designer of medals (died 1637)
Chen Hongshou, Chinese painter of late Ming Dynasty (died 1652)
Willem Hondius, Dutch engraver, cartographer and painter (died 1652/1658)
Lambert Jacobsz, Dutch painter (died 1636)
Jean Lemaire, French painter (died 1659)
Bernard van Linge, Dutch glass and enamel painter (died 1644)
probable - Wang Jian, Chinese landscape painter during the Qing Dynasty (died 1677)

Deaths
March 27 - Theodor de Bry, Flemish-born engraver, draftsman and book editor and publisher (born 1528)
April 19 - Hans Fugger, patron of the arts (born 1531)
June 25 - Giacomo Gaggini, Italian sculptor (born 1517)
December 28 - Gillis Mostaert, Dutch painter, son of Jan Mostaert (b. c.1535)
date unknown
Giovanni Antonio di Amato the younger, Italian painter (born 1528)
René Boyvin, French engraver who lived in Angers (born 1525)
Benedetto Caliari, Italian painter (born 1538)
Jacopino del Conte, Italian Mannerist painter (born 1510)
Guillaume Le Bé, French engraver (born 1525)
probable - Marcin Kober, Polish court painter to King Stefan Batory (born 1550)

 
Years of the 16th century in art